The CIÉ 8100 class (also known as the 8300 class) were the first electric multiple units used on the Dublin Area Rapid Transit (DART) system. Built by GEC and Linke-Hofmann-Busch in 1983, they are two-car units, and were the only units used on the DART before the arrival of the 8200 Class. 40 two-car sets were delivered, numbered 8101/8301 to 8140/8340. 81XX units are power cars while 83XX units are unpowered driving trailers. The driving cabs are full width, with the inner ends connected by gangways. Power cars always head north, while driving trailers head south.

History

The original seating layout consisted of 72 seats per coach with 16 tip up seats at the doors, giving 176 seats in total. With increasing passenger numbers and the heavy spring in the tip up seats becoming a possible source of injury, the tip seats were removed in the late 1980s. As a result of ever continuing passenger demand in the late 1990s extra standing room was provided through the removal of 16 seats from the 83XX unpowered driving trailers, reducing seating capacity to 56 giving a 2 car unit a total of 128 seats.

8110-8310 and 8136-8336 were scrapped after suffering serious damage in a fire at Fairview depot on 14 July 2001.

When the 8600 Class units entered service from 2001, a number of 8100 Class units were modified to make up six car sets with them. Since the refurbishment detailed below this is no longer possible. The units concerned were 8101, 8102, 8108, 8114 to 8118, 8120, 8122, 8123, 8126, 8135 and 8137.

All of the remaining units returned to service in 2007 and 2008 following refurbishment by Siemens. This included the installation of modified marker lights, removal of some seats to add more standing space giving all coaches 64 seats and space for a wheelchair, installation of an electronic passenger information system, new wheel slide protection equipment and digital traction control to replace the outdated analogue system and installation of a door closing warning beeper. It was also supposedly intended to allow the units to operate in 8-car sets, the original units being limited to six cars, but some unmodified LHB sets had operated in 8-car formations during 2007.

As with other DART units, they are maintained at Fairview depot, as well as being stabled at Bray. By January 2013, as reported in the ITG Magazine "Irish Mail" sets 8103, 8105, 8113 and 8138 were temporarily stored out of service. All these units were returned to revenue service except 8103-8303, which remained in storage not having run since 18 August 2010, however this unit returned to revenue service on 20 September 2018.

On 13 September 2017 the 16:45 service from Howth to Bray, formed by a six car 8100 Class unit was derailed on a set of points at Dún Laoghaire station. The train was led by 8308-8108, both bogies of 8308 derailed as did one of 8108. Two passengers required medical attention according to official sources. There was widespread criticism on social media over Irish Rail's response to the incident both from passengers delayed on other services and the derailed train itself due to the lack of information and the time it took to evacuate the derailed train.

In 2023, Irish Rail issued a tender  to investigate the option of extending the service life of the class until 2034, 50 years since their introduction in to service.

Fleet details

See also

Multiple Units of Ireland
Dublin Area Rapid Transit

References

External links
Irish Rail Fleet Information webpage 

Iarnród Éireann multiple units
Train-related introductions in 1983
1500 V DC multiple units